The Diamond Mountains is a mountain range in Lassen and Plumas Counties, California.

Notable Features 
Diamond Mountain

Thompson Peak and Lookout

Black Mountain and Lookout

Meadow View Peak

Crystal Peak

Adams Peak

Beckwourth Pass

Headwaters of Indian and Last Chance Creeks

See Also 

Diamond Mountain National Forest

References 

Mountain ranges of Plumas County, California
Mountain ranges of the Sierra Nevada (United States)